D222 is a state road in Dalmatia region of Croatia branching off north from the D62 to Mali Prolog border crossing to Bosnia and Herzegovina.

The road, as well as all other state roads in Croatia, is managed and maintained by Hrvatske ceste, a state-owned company.

Road junctions and populated areas

Sources

State roads in Croatia
Transport in Dubrovnik-Neretva County